Voetbal Vereniging Cicerone, known as Cicerone, is a Surinamese football club based in Paramaribo that played in the Hoofdklasse, the highest level of football in Suriname.

History
Cicerone was founded as an artistic dance club on 26 October 1910. Over the years the club evolved into a multisports club, including a Korfball, Football and Basketball team. The football branch was founded on 1 February 1929 in Paramaribo, Suriname, Cicerone are an older football club, and one of the first clubs to compete in the Hoofdklasse, the highest level of football in the country, winning the National title four seasons in a row from 1931 to 1935. They have also won the Dragten Cup twice, the Emancipation Cup twice, and the Bueno Cup once. In 1933, Cicerone played the first match against a Venezuelan club in Suriname, when they played Deportivo Español on 2 September 1933 in a 1–1 draw. It was Cicerone's 25th consecutive match unbeaten (21 wins, 4 draws) losing the following match 1–0 to SV Voorwaarts.

Notable former players of Cicerone from the clubs' period at the top flight in Suriname include Charles Naloop, R. Pinas, Leo Rijzenburg, C. Cairo, Charles Wijdenbosch, Richard Wijdenbosch, J. Eendragt, Anton Balrak, Bil Bromet, Cornelis Naloop, and Eugene René Enz. The first chairman of the club was O. Stenhuys, while the teams' talent scout was Jurion Henny Stenhuys who recruited players from around the Gonggrijpstraat and the Prinssessestraat in the Capital city.

Achievements
 SVB Hoofdklasse: 4
1931–32, 1932–33, 1933–34, 1934–35

 Dragtenbeker: 2
1932, 1933

 Emancipatiebeker: 2
1933, 1936

 Cup Bueno: 1
1933

References

Cicerone
Cicerone
1929 establishments in Suriname